The Test Stakes is an American Thoroughbred horse race open to three-year-old fillies and run each summer at the Saratoga Race Course in Saratoga Springs, New York. It is contested at a distance of seven furlongs on the dirt and is an influential race in shaping the Breeders' Cup Filly & Mare Sprint.  A Grade I event, it carries a purse of $500,000.

It was first run at Saratoga in 1922.  Over the years it has also become an important race for fillies pointing towards the Grade I Alabama Stakes which also runs at Saratoga Race Course.

Inaugurated at a mile and quarter, it went to seven furlongs in its second running.  The Test Stakes took place at Belmont Park in 1943, 1944, and 1945.  It was not run from 1923 to 1925 or in 1961.  It was run in two divisions in 1960, 1962, 1963, 1965, 1966, 1967, 1970, 1973, 1974, 1975, 1977, 1978, and 1979.

Records
Speed record:
 1:20.83 – Lady Tak (2003),Gamine (2020)

Most wins by a jockey:
 6 – Jerry Bailey (1988, 1994, 1995, 1997, 2002, 2003)

Most wins by a trainer:
 5 – James Fitzsimmons (1928, 1942, 1951, 1956, 1963)

Most wins by an owner:
 3 – Wheatley Stable (1928, 1963, 1965)
 3 – Ogden Phipps (1956, 1972, 1979)

Winners

References

 The Test Stakes at Pedigree Query
 The Test Stakes at the NTRA
 Test Stakes at Saratoga Race Course

Flat horse races for three-year-old fillies
Grade 1 stakes races in the United States
Horse races in the United States
Recurring sporting events established in 1922
Saratoga Race Course